Lev  Mykolajovych Kolodub  (1 May 1930 – 23 February 2019),  was a Ukrainian composer and teacher,  Honored Artist of Ukraine (1973), People's Artist of Ukraine(1993). Recipient of  Shevchenko National Prize (2010). Head of Ukrainian Music Foundation (1988—1994) Kyiv branch of National Union of Composers of Ukraine (1994—1999).

Biography 
Lev Kolodub was born on 1 May 1930 in Kyiv. His mother was an opera singer, her grandmother was a music teacher. He studied at the Kharkiv Secondary Specialized Music Boarding School as a clarinetist, later  at the Kharkiv Conservatory as a composer. After graduating from the conservatory in 1954 he worked in Kiev.

From 1958 to 1960 he taught music theory at the Kyiv Theater Institute, and from 1966 he taught at the Kyiv Conservatory, from 1985 as professor. In 1997 he headed a recently established Music Information Technology Department of the Kyiv Conservatory.

From 1994 to 1997 he was the chairman of the Kyiv branch of National Union of Composers of Ukraine.

He was from 1997 a corresponding member and from 2005 an academic of the Academy of Arts of Ukraine.

Lev Kolodub was married to Zhanna Kolodub, a Ukrainian composer and pianist.

He died on 23 February 2019 in Kyiv at the age of 89.

Legacy
The creative legacy of Levko Kolodub includes 4 operas, 4 operettas, 2 ballets, 12 symphonies, numerous concertos for wind instruments with orchestra, as well as chamber music and music for cinema. Pieces for wind instruments hold a special place and have been highly appreciated by Ukrainian musicians. His symphonic music is based in Ukrainian folklore and usually carries some kind of an agenda. The 9th, 10th and 11th symphonies were awarded with the Shevchenko National Prize. Although he was never part of the avant-garde movement of the 1960s, he was a composer of interesting and colourful music and always a superb craftsman.

Selected works 

Operas
 A Duma about Turbay (Дума про Турбаї, 1951);
 Awakening (Пробудження, 1976)
 Unrequited Love («Незраджена любов», 1985)
 Poet (Поет, 1988)
Operettas
 Merry Girls (Веселі дівчата, co-authored with Zhanna Kolodub, 1968)
 Adventures in Mississippi (Пригоди на Міссісіпі co-authored with Zhanna Kolodub, 1971)
 City of Lovers (Місто закоханих, 1969)
 I love you (Люблю тебе, 1975)

Symphonies
Symphony № 1, 1958.
Symphony-Duma № 2, "Shevchenko's images", 1964.
Symphony № 3, "Symphony in the style of the Ukrainian Baroque", 1980.
Symphony № 4, "Symphony '86", 1986.
Symphony № 5, "Pro memoria" (Memory of the victims of terrible disasters in Ukraine), 1990.
Symphony № 6, "C major and A. Schoenberg", 1999.
Symphony № 7, "Metamorphoses", 2000 (2nd edition - 2003)
Symphony № 8, Pryluky (for young performers), 2003.
Symphony № 9, "New Feelings", 2004.
Symphony № 10, "According to the sketches of young years", 2005.
Symphony № 11, New Shores, 2007.
Symphony № 12, "Zeitheist" ("Spirit of Time").

Concertos for solo instruments and orchestra
2 concertos for horn and orchestra (1972, 1980),
2 concertos  for trumpet and orchestra   (1982, 1996),
2 concertos for trombone and orchestra  (1986, 1997),
Concerto for 2 violins and orchestra (1988),
2 concertos for violin and orchestra (1992, 2000),
2 concertos for clarinet and orchestra (1995, 2004),
Concerto for bassoon and orchestra (1997),
Concerto for oboe and orchestra (1997),
Concertina for 2 French horns (Ukrainian, 1982),
Concertina for the tube (Epic, 1986),
Concertina for 4 saxophones (1985),
Concertina for oboe (2001);

Notes

References

External links 
 Lev Kolodub, at the National Academy of Arts of Ukraine
 Lev Kolodub, at the Encyclopedia of Modern Ukraine
 
 M. Zahaykevych, I. Sikorska. Kolodub Lev  Mykolajovych In Ukrainian Music Encyclopedia. T. 2, p. 500-502

1930 births
2019 deaths
Soviet composers
Ukrainian composers
Commons category link is on Wikidata
Recipients of the title of Merited Artist of Ukraine
Recipients of the title of People's Artists of Ukraine
Recipients of the Order of Merit (Ukraine), 3rd class